Sava Trlajić (Serbian Cyrillic: Сава Трлајић; 19 July 1884 – August 1941) was a Bishop of the Serbian Orthodox Church serving as Bishop of the Eparchy of Gornji Karlovac in the Kingdom of Yugoslavia from 1938 until the beginning of World War II.

He was murdered by Ustaše of the Nazi Germany-aligned Independent State of Croatia in August 1941. The Serbian Orthodox Church venerates him as a Saint.

Life
He was born Svetozar Trlajić to Stevan and Jelisaveta (née Karakašević) in Mol on 18 July 1884. His education included the primary school in his hometown, a grammar school in Novi Sad, and seminary of Sremski Karlovci. He then went on to graduate from the Faculty of Law at the University of Belgrade and passed the qualifying examination for judges at the Faculty of Law at the University of Zagreb.

In 1909, he was ordained a deacon by the Bishop of Timișoara and then presbyter ten days later. As a parish priest, he served at parishes in Peška and Bašaid. Early in 1927, he was appointed to an administrative position, and later principal secretary, of the Holy Synod of Bishops of the Church of Serbia. When his wife died, he took monastic vows on 27 October 1929 in the Krušedol Monastery, being tonsured with the name Sava. Soon afterward he became rector and archimandrite of the Krušedol Monastery. On 30 September 1930, Sava was elected Auxiliary Bishop of Sremski Karlovci. He was consecrated in Sremski Karlovci by Patriarch Varnava, Bishop Emilijan of Timok, Bishop Jovan of Niš, Bishop Tihon of the Eparchy of Zahumlje and Herzegovina, and Bishop Simeon of Zletovo and Strumica. As Patriarchal Vicar Bishop Sava chaired the diocesan council of the Archbishopric of Belgrade and Karlovci. From early 1937, Bishop Sava chaired the ecclesiastical court. He was appointed Bishop of Gornji Karlovac on 22 June 1938, with his residence in Plaški. After the death of Bishop Miron of Pakrac in 1941, he was also named administrator of the Eparchy of Slavonia.

Martyrdom
After the Invasion of Yugoslavia and the formation of the Nazi Germany-aligned Independent State of Croatia, Plaški was first occupied by Italian forces and then turned over to the Ustashi Croatians in late 1941. Bishop Sava and nine priests were then taken, hostage. On 23 May 1941, Ustashi occupied the bishop's residence and expelled Bishop Sava. On June 8, the notorious executioner Josip Tomljenović ordered all diocesan money and records to be handed over to the Ustashi. Bp. Sava refused the Ustashi order to leave his diocese and go to Belgrade. Not wanting to abandon his flock, he refused. Bishop Sava was arrested on June 17, 1941, and confined, together with three other Serbian priests and thirteen eminent Serbian laymen, in a stable owned by Josip Tomljenović in Plaški. After experiencing intense torture, Bishop Sava and the priests, Bogoljub Gaković, Đuro Stojanović, and Stanislav Nasadilo, were chained and taken to the Gospić concentration camp on 19 July 1941. There, they were tortured until mid-August. At that time Bishop Sava was taken together with 2,000 Serbs toward the Velebit Mountains. Somewhere on this mountain, he was murdered together with thousands of other Orthodox Serbs. The site is still unknown.

Canonization
In 1998, at the regular session of the Holy Assembly of Bishops of the Serbian Orthodox Church, Bishop Sava was glorified and entered into the list of names of the saints of the Serbian Orthodox Church as hieromartyr.

See also
 List of Serbian saints

References 

1884 births
1941 deaths
People from Ada, Serbia
Bishops of the Serbian Orthodox Church
Serbian saints of the Eastern Orthodox Church
Persecution of Serbs
20th-century Eastern Orthodox martyrs
20th-century Christian saints
New Martyrs
Hieromartyrs
University of Belgrade Faculty of Law alumni
People executed by the Independent State of Croatia
Serb people who died in the Holocaust
Serbian torture victims
Serbian civilians killed in World War II